Omung Kumar Bhandula  is an Indian film director, and production designer, known for his works in Hindi cinema. He had hosted one of the famous show Ek Minute on Zee TV 90s. He made his directorial debut with the 2014 biographical sports drama Mary Kom starring Priyanka Chopra. The film was a critical and commercial success. He and the film received several awards and nominations, including the National Film Award for Best Popular Film Providing Wholesome Entertainment. He came up with his second film Sarbjit which was a biopic based on the life of "Sarabjit Singh". The film was commercially and critically success at the box office. Then he came up with his third film 'Bhoomi', which was Sanjay Dutt's comeback film which is a critical and commercial failure.

Career 
Kumar started his career as a production designer. He worked on Sanjay Leela Bhansali's films such as Black (2005) and Saawariya (2007). He made his directorial debut with the 2014 biographical sports drama Mary Kom based on the eponymous boxer. The film starring Priyanka Chopra as Kom was a critical and commercial success. He and the film received several awards and nominations, including the National Film Award for Best Popular Film Providing Wholesome Entertainment. He first started as anchor of ek minute game show on Zee TV

Filmography

References

External links 
 

Living people
Hindi-language film directors
21st-century Indian film directors
Directors who won the Best Popular Film Providing Wholesome Entertainment National Film Award
Year of birth missing (living people)